James J. Shuttleworth (1937  – 2003) was an American inventor and entrepreneur who founded Shuttleworth, Inc. He was an active business and community leader in Northeastern Indiana.

Education
Shuttleworth was a graduate of Warren High School in 1955. He attended Purdue University and received a Bachelor of Science degree in mechanical engineering in 1960.

Activities after graduation
Shuttleworth returned to his family’s canning and machinery operation. In 1962, he purchased the machinery side of the business and founded the Shuttleworth Machinery Corporation. Serving as engineer, salesman and president, he built the company into a leader in automated material handling systems. The company was renamed Shuttleworth, Inc. in 1974.

Jim learned to fly while still in school and noted that flying played a significant role in growing his company. He restored vintage aircraft, including   a 1943 AT-6G Texan and a P-51 Mustang that was once flown by Robin Olds. Shuttleworth also founded the Wings of Freedom Museum in 1996. This collection now resides at the Hoosier Air Museum.

Death
Jim died while piloting a TF-51 Dual Control Mustang near Wabash, Indiana on February 20, 2003.

Honors
1990: Purdue University Distinguished Engineering Alumnus Award
1991: Outstanding Mechanical Engineer by the Purdue School of Mechanical Engineering
1995: Exporter of the Year - Indiana Business Magazine
1997: Northern Indiana Entrepreneur of the Year
1998: Honorary degree from Huntington College

References

Purdue University School of Engineering
Shuttleworth, Inc. corporate archives

American manufacturing businesspeople
1937 births
2003 deaths